Glen is an census-designated place in Beaverhead County, Montana, United States. Glen has a post office with a ZIP code of 59732. Glen lies on U.S. Route 91, south of Melrose and north of Dillon. The Big Hole River runs past the east side of the town.

Glen started out in 1878 as Willis Station, named for Ozias Willis, the first postmaster. The name was shortened to Willis, then became Reichle, and finally became Glen in about 1950.

Demographics

Education
Glen provides elementary education at Reichle Elementary. High school is at Beaverhead County High School.

References

Unincorporated communities in Beaverhead County, Montana
Unincorporated communities in Montana